Jean-René Lisnard was the defending champion but decided not to participate.

Stefano Galvani won in the final 6–3, 6–1 against Benjamin Balleret.

Seeds

Draw

References
 Main Draw

Tennis at the 2011 Games of the Small States of Europe